Feet Fall Heavy is the second studio album by English alternative rock band Kill It Kid. It was released on 19 September 2011 by One Little Independent Records.

Production
The album was recorded at Fortress Studios in Shoreditch, UK, with producer Leo Abrahams over a period of ten days.

Track listing

Personnel

Musicians
 Chris Turpin – guitar, vocals
 Stephanie Ward – piano, vocals
 Marc Jones – drums, vocals
 Adam Timmins – bass, guitar, vocals

Production
 Leo Abrahams – producer
 Charlie Francis – engineer, mixing

References

External links
 Feet Fall Heavy at One Little Independent Records
 
 

2011 albums
One Little Independent Records albums